The 2000 Copa de la Reina de Fútbol was the 18th edition of the main Spanish women's football cup. It was played between 23 April and 25 June 2000 and Levante won its first title ever.

Bracket

References

External links
Results at Arquero-Arba

Copa de la Reina
Women
2008